Michael or Mick Cullen may refer to:
 Michael Cullen (politician) (1945–2021), New Zealand politician
 Michael C. Cullen or Mike Dred (born 1967), British DJ, music producer, and sound engineer
 Michael J. Cullen (1884–1936), American inventor of the supermarket
 Mick Cullen (born 1931), Scottish footballer
 Mike Cullen or John Michael Cullen (1927–2001), Australian ornithologist

See also 
 Cullen (surname)